The Church of el Carmen (Spanish: Iglesia del Carmen) is a church located in Madrid, Spain. It was declared Bien de Interés Cultural in 1983. It was formerly part of the Convento del Carmen Calzado complex.

See also
Catholic Church in Spain
List of oldest church buildings

References 

Carmen
Bien de Interés Cultural landmarks in Madrid
17th-century Roman Catholic church buildings in Spain
Baroque architecture in Madrid
Buildings and structures in Sol neighborhood, Madrid